Greystone or Graystone may refer to:

Locations
Graystone Manor, the first condominium building built in the continental United States
Greystone, West Virginia
 Greystone Airport, a private airport in Ocala, Florida
 Greystone (estate), a historical estate and gardens near New York City
 Greystone Mansion, Beverly Hills, California mansion built by/for Edward L. Doheny, listed on the NRHP as Doheny Estate/Greystone
 Greystone (Harrodsburg, Kentucky), listed on the NRHP in Mercer County, Kentucky
 Greystone Castle, Reno, Nevada
 Greystone (Durham, North Carolina)
 Greystone Historic District, North Providence, Rhode Island
 Greystone Mill Historic District, North Providence, Rhode Island
 Greystone Cellars, St. Helena, California, NRHP-listed, in Napa County
 Greystone Villa-Cabin 18, Cleveland National Forest, California
 Gustave Greystone-Meissner House, Pevely, Missouri
 Greystone Golf & Country Club, a private golf course in Birmingham, Alabama
 Greystone Golf Course, a public golf course in White Hall, Maryland
 Greystone (Knoxville), an NRHP-listed house in Knoxville, Tennessee
 Greystone, Yonkers, a neighborhood in Northwest Yonkers, New York
 Greystone (Metro-North station), a railroad station in Westchester County, New York

Other uses
Greystone Park Psychiatric Hospital, a Kirkbride Plan "lunatic asylum", built in the late 1800s, in Parsippany-Troy Hills Township, New Jersey
Greystone (architecture), a style of buildings faced in grey limestone
Greystone Park, a 2012 American film
Greystone Ltd, a private military contracting firm
Greystone (CIA operation), alleged umbrella operation for covert actions by the CIA in the Middle East after the September 11 attacks
The Culinary Institute of America at Greystone (originally Greystone Cellars), a culinary college branch campus

See also
Greystones (disambiguation)